The 2003 Centrix Financial Grand Prix of Denver was the fifteenth round of the 2003 CART World Series season, held on August 31, 2003 on the streets of Denver, Colorado.

Qualifying results

Race

Caution flags

Notes 

 New Track Record Bruno Junqueira 1:01.438 (Qualification Session #1)
 New Race Record Bruno Junqueira 2:03:10.259
 Average Speed 85.044 mph

References

External links
 Full Weekend Times & Results

Denver
Centrix Financial Grand Prix of Denver
Centrix Financial Grand Prix of Denver